Patrick James Lindsay (18 January 1914 – 29 June 1993) was an Irish politician and lawyer.

Early life
He was born in 1914 in the Rotunda Hospital, Dublin, the eldest of three sons and four daughters of Patrick Lindsay, post office worker, and his wife Mary (née Keegan). Before his second birthday, the family returned to their native County Mayo, settling in the village of Doolough, Kiltane parish, Erris. He received his primary education at Gweesalia national school, and attended secondary school at St. Muiredach's College, Ballina. He subsequently attended University College Galway, where he studied ancient classics, between 1933 and 1937, graduating with an M.A. He was a noted figure in the college – a gifted orator, he served on the committee of the Literary and Debating Society, and took part in the productions of the Drama Society. He was also a member of the Blueshirts movement while in college. He was only just dissuaded by his classics professor at the last moment from embarking with the Irish Brigade under Eoin O'Duffy to fight for Franco in the Spanish Civil War.

However, while Lindsay declared himself as being "an unrepentant" Blueshirt, in his autobiography he denied that himself or many of the membership saw themselves as actual Fascists. Rather that they viewed themselves as a pseudo-paramilitary wing of Cumann na nGaedheal that was a response to the IRA of the 1930s acting as a pseudo-paramilitary wing of Fianna Fail, and in fact, that they saw themselves as Democrats upholding free speech.  

 

Lindsay subsequently became a teacher of classics at the Royal School, Cavan, and later at schools in Dublin. He studied law at University College Dublin and the King's Inns, and was called to the Irish Bar in 1946. He married Moya Brady in 1952, and they had three children.

Politics
He was elected to Dáil Éireann on his sixth attempt, at the 1954 general election as a Fine Gael Teachta Dála (TD) for Mayo North. He was re-elected at the 1957 general election, but lost his seat at the 1961 general election, after which he was elected to the 10th Seanad by the Industrial and Commercial Panel. He became Leas-Chathaoirleach of the Seanad.

Linday returned to the Dáil at the 1965 general election, but lost his seat at the 1969 general election, when he switched constituency to Dublin North-Central. He was again unsuccessful at the 1973 general election.

His ministerial career was brief, lasting only eight months. In July 1956, he was appointed by Taoiseach John A. Costello as Parliamentary Secretary to the Minister for the Gaeltacht and to the Minister for Education in the Second Inter-Party Government. In October 1956, he was promoted to the cabinet as Minister for the Gaeltacht, serving until March 1957, when Fianna Fáil returned to power after the 1957 general election. On his return to the Dáil in 1965, he was appointed Fine Gael spokesman on transport and power.

Law
Lindsay had become a Senior Counsel in 1954, and following the loss of his parliamentary seat in 1969, he devoted himself full-time to his practice at the bar, becoming a leading figure in criminal law. In 1975, he was appointed to the position of Master of the High Court, from which he retired on his seventieth birthday in January 1984.

Later life
Lindsay served as chairman of Cumann Céimithe na Gaillimhe, the University College Galway Graduate Association, during the 1980s. He published his memoirs in 1992. He died on 29 June 1993.

References

Sources
Obituary, The Irish Times, 30 June 1993.

 

1914 births
1993 deaths
Alumni of King's Inns
Alumni of the University of Galway
Fine Gael senators
Members of the 10th Seanad
Members of the 15th Dáil
Members of the 16th Dáil
Members of the 18th Dáil
Members of the Blueshirts
Parliamentary Secretaries of the 15th Dáil
Politicians from County Dublin
Politicians from County Mayo
Masters of the High Court (Ireland)